War of the Two Brothers may refer to:

 Inca Civil War, 1529–1532, Peru
 Liberal Wars, 1828–1834, Portugal
 War of Brothers, 1988–1990, Lebanon